The 1994 AXA Equity & Law League was the twenty-sixth competing of English cricket's Sunday League.  The competition was won, as part of their historic treble of County Championship, Sunday League and Benson & Hedges Cup, by Warwickshire County Cricket Club.

Standings

Batting averages

Bowling averages

See also
Sunday League

References

AXA
Pro40